is a Japanese football player who plays for FC Machida Zelvia.

Playing career
Takahashi was born in Kagoshima Prefecture on April 17, 1999. After graduating from high school, he joined J1 League club Shimizu S-Pulse in 2018.

In August 2019, after a year and a half in Shimizu in which Takahashi only had several times played in J. League Cup matches, he was transferred to Giravanz Kitakyushu in J3 League(promoted to J2 League in the following season) on loan, in which he became one of the key players, eventually played for 98 games, and made 26 goals in 2 years and a half.

Takahashi has been called back to Shimizu after 2021 season.

Career statistics

Last update: 14 January 2022

References

External links

1999 births
Living people
Association football people from Kagoshima Prefecture
Japanese footballers
J1 League players
J2 League players
J3 League players
Shimizu S-Pulse players
Giravanz Kitakyushu players
FC Machida Zelvia players
Association football forwards